Airdrop is an aerial re-supply tactic created during World War II.

Airdrop may also refer to:

Airdrop (cryptocurrency), a procedure of distributing tokens
AirDrop, an Apple service to wirelessly share files
Airdrop Peak, a mountain in Antarctica